Hartford is a city in Warren County, Iowa, United States. The population was 733 at the time of the 2020 census. It is part of the Des Moines–West Des Moines Metropolitan Statistical Area.

History
Hartford was laid out in 1849 by John D. Hartman. John D. Hartman was the father of an Indianola mayor.

Geography
Hartford is located at  (41.459662, -93.402089).

Demographics

2010 census
As of the census of 2010, there were 771 people, 279 households, and 208 families residing in the city. The racial makeup of the city was 97.4% White, 0.6% African American, 0.1% Native American, 0.5% Asian, 0.5% from other races, and 0.8% from two or more races. Hispanic or Latino of any race were 2.5% of the population.

There were 279 households, of which 41.2% had children under the age of 18 living with them, 56.3% were married couples living together, 11.8% had a female householder with no husband present, 6.5% had a male householder with no wife present, and 25.4% were non-families. 20.8% of all households were made up of individuals, and 9% had someone living alone who was 65 years of age or older. The average household size was 2.76 and the average family size was 3.19.

The median age in the city was 33.3 years. 30.6% of residents were under the age of 18; 6.8% were between the ages of 18 and 24; 28.7% were from 25 to 44; 24.7% were from 45 to 64; and 9.2% were 65 years of age or older. The gender makeup of the city was 51.2% male and 48.8% female.

2000 census
As of the census of 2000, there were 759 people, 271 households, and 208 families residing in the city. The racial makeup of the city was 95.13% White, 1.98% Native American, 1.98% from other races, and 0.92% from two or more races. Hispanic or Latino of any race were 4.35% of the population.

There were 271 households, out of which 40.6% had children under the age of 18 living with them, 63.1% were married couples living together, 8.9% had a female householder with no husband present, and 23.2% were non-families. 20.3% of all households were made up of individuals, and 7.7% had someone living alone who was 65 years of age or older. The average household size was 2.80 and the average family size was 3.20.

In the city, the population was spread out, with 30.3% under the age of 18, 7.2% from 18 to 24, 30.2% from 25 to 44, 23.3% from 45 to 64, and 9.0% who were 65 years of age or older. The median age was 33 years. For every 100 females, there were 102.4 males. For every 100 females age 18 and over, there were 98.1 males.

The median income for a household in the city was $39,539, and the median income for a family was $45,125. Males had a median income of $31,726 versus $25,882 for females. The per capita income for the city was $18,141. About 2.4% of families and 4.7% of the population were below the poverty line, including 4.9% of those under age 18 and 3.5% of those age 65 or over.

Education
Carlisle Community Schools operates public schools. One school, Hartford Upper Elementary School (grades 4–5), is in Hartford.

References

Cities in Iowa
Cities in Warren County, Iowa
Des Moines metropolitan area
1849 establishments in Iowa